Shahriyar Majidzade (born 10 September 1986) is the founder of the newspaper Etatist and chairman of the National Idea Centre in Azerbaijan.

Family 

Shahriyar Majidzade's father, Sardar Hamidov, was the head of Executive Power in Tartar, located near the borders in Nagorno-Karabakh, and was also the commander of the Tartar self-defence battalion. On 15 May 1994 the Bishkek cease-fire was declared between Armenia and Azerbaijan and 10 days later Hamidov was dismissed from his position.

Life 

Shahriyar Majidzade was born on 10 September 1986 in the Tartar region. Until the end of the war he studied at school  1 in Tartar. In 1994 he continued his secondary education in Baku, N. Narimanov district at school No. 77. After his father's incarceration in 1997, he went to Elite Gymnasium and graduated from the gymnasium in 2003.

In 2005 he was accepted to Taras Shevchenko National University of Kyiv in the faculty of International Law, later graduating with honors. He was the only overseas student who was recognized by the university administration for his activity and his serious observance of the disciplinary rules.

After graduation in 2009 he was called to active military service and entered the Education and Training Centre of the Armed Forces of the Republic of Azerbaijan. According to the order of the Ministry of Defence, he was appointed platoon commander in 2010 with the rank of lieutenant and was sent to a frontline military unit.

Career 

In July 2011 he was discharged from military service and in October he began to publish the weekly newspaper Etatist. On 5 May 2012 National Idea Centre (NIC) was founded by a group of youth and on 15 June Majidzade was elected as its chairman.

In November 2012, with the initiatives of Majidzade, an editorial staff composed of volunteer NIC members started to publish an online edition of Etatist.

During his leadership NIC organized approximately 60 lectures by political figures, poets, writers, and academics, and organized several events and discussions for youth. NIC also conducted extensive research on radical religious groups in Tartar and advised public and government bodies.

In October 2012 the NIC scrutinized "sexual education" proposals by the Azerbaijan Social Politics Committee and advised the public to its drawbacks, claiming in their research the ineffectiveness of the practise in other countries and negative psychological impacts to children. One of Majidzade's main arguments took the example of the Shah of Iran, Reza Pahlavi, and his "White Revolution" of 1960 which induced establishment of religious opposition groups – if sexual education was taught at schools, conservative parents would not allow their daughters to go to school.

Majidzade brought attention to the activities of religious groups in opposition to Azerbaijan Republic's secular state.

In 2015, for the Azerbaijani parliamentary election, he nominated his candidacy for Tartar constituency No. 95. His candidacy was not initially registered and after complaint to the Central Election Commission he re-nominated his candidacy and registered for the election.

Arrest 

On February 19, 2014, Shahriyar Majidzadeh, together with members of the National Idea Center, headed by him, held a rally in front of the Nasimi statue in Baku. The reason for the action was the failure of the planned concert of the young nationalist rapper "Kabus" on February 16 at the cinema "Vatan" in Baku. Police said the concert was illegal and racist, did not allow it. Shahriyar Majidzadeh and a group of young people protested against the decision, claiming that the incident was illegal. However, as a result of police intervention, the action did not take place. Shahriyar Majidzadeh was arrested and taken away by four plainclothes men.

Demonstrations 

Advocating legal statehood concepts within society, Majidzade held "28 May" rally on Republic Day, at the park Sahil (formerly 26 Baku Commissars Square) to express the repression of Soviet Imperialism.
  
Considering the uprising against to the state and coming to power through non-constitutional way as a treasure of Suret Huseynov, NIC held a demonstration on 4 June 2012. 

In 2012, promoting literacy and educational enlightenment, NIC held "Read and perceive yourself!".

In 2012, director of school No. 283 sued online newspaper Etatist and demanded . Majidzade organized an event "Dead Education – Dead Generation" and NIC launched a demonstration in front of the Ministry of Education while youth held a virtual demonstration and demanded withdrawing the case. On 24 October there was a press announcement that the plaintiff had withdrawn and the demonstration was postponed.

References 

1986 births
Living people
Azerbaijani journalists
Politics of Azerbaijan